An election to Mayo County Council took place on 5 June 2009 as part of that year's Irish local elections. 31 councillors were elected from six electoral divisions by PR-STV voting for a five-year term of office.

Results by party

Results by Electoral Area

Ballina

Belmullet

Castlebar

Claremorris

Swinford

Westport

External links
 Official website

2009 Irish local elections
2009